CCW may refer to:

 Counterclockwise

Organizations

 Catholic College Wodonga, a Catholic school in Wodonga, Victoria, Australia
 Center on Conscience & War, an American pacifist non-government organization
 Co-operative Central Wholesale, an American consumer cooperative supply organization
 Countryside Council for Wales, a Welsh wildlife and landscaping governmental agency

Sports leagues

 Celebrity Championship Wrestling, short-lived television reality program featuring Hulk Hogan
 Continental Championship Wrestling a professional wrestling promotion in Southern Alabama, Northern Florida that closed in 1990

Technical terminology
 connect component workbench
 Channel command word specialized I/O instruction on IBM mainframes
 Coherent CW, a variant of CW radiocommunication used in amateur radio
 COM callable wrapper, in Microsoft Component Object Model and .NET interoperability
 Computer Combination Weigher – multihead weigher build by Ishida.

Military and weaponry
 Carrying a Concealed Weapon, carrying a concealed handgun or other weapon in public
 Chinese Civil War, internal struggle for control of China, 1927–1950
 Convention on Certain Conventional Weapons, a 1983 international treaty prohibiting weapons considered to be excessively injurious or indiscriminate

Other uses
 CCW (album), an album by Hugh Cornwell
 Cowell Airport, IATA airport code "CCW"

See also

 
 
 C2W
 CW (disambiguation)
 CWW (disambiguation)
 C (disambiguation)
 W (disambiguation)
 CWC (disambiguation)
 WCC (disambiguation)